Towers of Silence is a 1952 West German adventure film directed by Hans Bertram and starring Philip Dorn, Gisela Uhlen, and Carl Raddatz.

The film's sets were designed by Max Mellin. It was shot on location in Amsterdam, Damascus and Palmyra.

Cast

References

Bibliography

External links 
 

1952 films
1952 adventure films
German adventure films
West German films
1950s German-language films
Films directed by Hans Bertram
Films set in Syria
Treasure hunt films
German black-and-white films
1950s German films